Veluthampi Dalawa is a 1962 Malayalam-language historical drama film based on the life of Velu Thampi Dalawa, the Dewan of Travancore during the first decade of 19th century, was one of the first to rebel against the British East India Company's supremacy. The film, directed by G. Viswanath and written by Jagathy N. K. Achary was shot in Newton Studios. Kottarakkara Sreedharan Nair, Thikkurissy Sukumaran Nair, Prem Nawas, Adoor Bhasi, G. K. Pillai, Ragini, Ambika Sukumaran and Sukumari portrayed prominent roles. The dances were choreographed by Chinni and Sampath along with Kalamandalam Madhavan. The film was a box office success.

Plot
The story begins during the tyrannical regime of Jayanthan Namboodiri, the 'Dalawa' of Travancore. The country was plagued by corruption and mismanagement at all levels. Veluthampi, who was in royal service, succeeded in exposing the tyranny of Jayanthan Namboodiri and rose to the position of Dalawa. Jayanthan Namboodiri’s ears were cut as punishment, and he was banished from Travancore.

Veluthampi resorted to harsh punishments in order to improve the law and order of the kingdom. His overbearing conduct created resentment among his colleagues. The corrupt revenue officer Mallan Pillai was punished and terminated from service. The powerful cabinet official Kunju Neelan Pillai and his group were supporters of the British East India Company. They leaked the defence secrets of the country to the Resident British Officer Macaulay. Veluthampi was vigilant and, in his landmark 'Kundara Proclamation' urged the people to fight against the British. This made him popular among the states of Cochin and Kozhikode, and they offered their support to him in his fight against the British.

Jagadambika was in love with Veluthampi and supported him in his plans against the British. She entered Macaulay’s bungalow in disguise and managed to recover the defence files, but was shot dead. Before she died, Jagadambika handed over the files to Veluthampi. He took an oath to drive away the British from the country.

The British succeeded in invading and bringing under their control several towns and villages surrounding Thiruvananthapuram. Veluthampi requested the king to release more arms and ammunition, including rifles, to fight against the British. Kunju Neelan Pillai alleged that it was Veluthampi who provoked the British against Travancore. The king believes the allegation, and Veluthampi quit his post as Dalawa. After conducting the marriage of his niece Seethalakshmi and Unni Namboodiri, Veluthampi left to take refuge in the sanctum sanctorum of Mannadi Temple along with his brother Padmanabhan Thampi. The British surrounded the temple, but Veluthampi killed himself before they could enter; Padmanabhan decapitated Veluthampi.

Cast

 Kottarakkara Sreedharan Nair as Veluthampi Dalawa
 Thikkurissy Sukumaran Nair as Jayanthan Namboodiri
 Ragini as Jagadambika
 Adoor Bhasi as Mallan Pillai
 Ambika Sukumaran as Seethalakshmi
 Prem Nawas as Unni Namboodiri
 G. K. Pillai as Kunju Neelan Pillai
 Satyapal as Macaulay
 Bahadoor as Peter, Macauly's butler
 Sukumari as Janaki
 Aranmula Ponnamma
 N. N. Pillai
 T. R. Omana as Rahael
 Kedamangalam Sadanandan
 Parthasarathy
 R. N. Nambiar
 A. R. Kizhuthally
 Panjabi as Subha Iyyer
 Velayudhan Nair
 Simhalan
 P. A. Thomas as Mathew Tharakan
 Wahab Kashmiri

Soundtrack 
The music was composed by V. Dakshinamoorthy and Parthasarathy and lyrics were written by Abhayadev. The tracks "Innu Nalla Laakkaa", "Viral Onnillenkilum", "Enthinu Moham", and "Kaathu Kolka Njangale" were popular during those times.

Legacy
The film's success and the performance of Kottarakkara Sreedharan Nair as Veluthampi Dalawa prompted Udaya Studio and director Kunchacko to cast him as Kerala Varma Pazhassi Raja in their historical film Pazhassi Raja (1964), but it did not perform well at the box office.

References

External links
 The Hindu article

1960s Malayalam-language films
1960s heist films
1960s historical films
Indian black-and-white films
Indian heist films
Films set in the British Raj
Films shot in Thiruvananthapuram
Films shot in Kollam
Films shot in Alappuzha
Films shot in Kochi
Films shot in Kozhikode
1962 films
Kalarippayattu films
History of India on film
History of Kerala on film
Indian historical films